Tummalapalem is located in western part of Vijayawada in the Indian state of Andhra Pradesh. It is a village falls under Ibrahimpatnam mandal in Vijayawada revenue division of NTR district. There is a proposal to merge this village into Vijayawada Municipal Corporation (VMC) to form a Greater Vijayawada Municipal Corporation.

See also 
Ibrahimpatnam mandal

References 

Villages in NTR district